Sabriel is a fantasy novel by Garth Nix, first published in 1995. It is the first in his Old Kingdom series, followed by Lirael, Abhorsen, Clariel, Goldenhand, and Terciel and Elinor.

Plot introduction
The novel is set in two neighbouring fictional countries: To the South lies Ancelstierre, which has a technology level and society similar to that of early-20th century Australia, and to the North lies the Old Kingdom, where both Free magic and Charter Magic exist—a fact officially denied by the government of Ancelstierre and disbelieved by most of Ancelstierre's inhabitants. A wall separates the two countries. Near the border some magic crosses the Wall, especially on days when the wind is blowing out of the Old Kingdom. Since the fall of the Royal Family, dangerous entities roam, ranging from the undead to powerful sorcerers and Free Magic elementals.

These living Dead are raised by Necromancers, diviners of the dead who roam the Old Kingdom or live in Death, using Hands to do their bidding. To remedy the problem of dangerous living dead, a necromancer under the title of Abhorsen uses a bandolier of Bells and a sword to put the dead to rest. At the time of Sabriel, it is her father Terciel who has the job of putting the dead to rest in the Old Kingdom, especially difficult since a new evil is rising.

When the current Abhorsen is overcome by one such evil and beyond the Seventh Gate, he sends his bells (the primary tools of a necromancer and used in various ways to control the Dead) and sword to his daughter Sabriel via an undead messenger bound and under his control.  Sabriel is at an Ancelstierre school for girls to remain out of reach of those who might try to strike at her father through her and end the Abhorsen bloodline. The bound undead is also attempting to speak, but she must enter death in order to make out the words. She is instructed by her father (speaking through the undead messenger in Death) to return to the Old Kingdom to take on the role of Abhorsen and stop Kerrigor's return to Life. While in Death obtaining her father's guidance, she narrowly avoids a fatal altercation with a Lesser Dead.

Plot summary
The book opens with Sabriel raising a freshly killed rabbit from death. She is a young girl attending Wyverly College, an all-female boarding school in Ancelstierre. An undead creature enters the dormitory where Sabriel lives and frightens all of the girls. Sabriel, however, notices it is holding a satchel and is attempting to speak. She enters Death to see what it is and notices strings attached to it passing over the waterfall of the First Gate; a sign that the creature is under the control of a necromancer further in Death. It is very weak, but Sabriel makes out that it is a messenger bound by her father who is past the Seventh Gate of Death. She is instructed by her father (through the messenger) that she is to take on the role of Abhorsen and defeat Kerrigor (a powerful Free Magic necromancer) who is attempting to make his way back into Life to break the Charter which binds the Free Magic and thus destroy the Charter of the Old Kingdom. She retrieves the satchel which contains the Abhorsen's bandelier of bells, the Abhorsen's sword and a map of the Old Kingdom.

Having left her school, Sabriel crosses the Wall using papers given to her by her father. Her destination is Abhorsen's House, the home of her father.  Near the wall, she meets a southern colonel and his troops.  The soldiers are using brute force to stop hordes of Shadow Hands from dismantling the Wall and crossing over. The areas near the Wall are being evacuated and only those who are inhabitants of the Old Kingdom are allowed the cross.

As she continues her journey, Sabriel becomes aware that she is being stalked by a Mordicant, a powerful Dead creature. She is able to outrun the creature and reach the safety of Abhorsen's House, which is located on an island in the center of the river. (The Dead cannot cross fast and deep running water.)

Inside Abhorsen's house, Sabriel is able to rest and obtain food and other supplies, as well as armor. She also meets Mogget, a Free Magic construct who takes the form of a small white cat, wearing a collar with a powerful binding spell on it and a miniature Saraneth hanging from it. Mogget insists on accompanying her on her journey to find her father. Later, they look out over the walls surrounding the house and discover the Dead attempting to build a bridge. Sabriel performs a ritual to summon a flood of water and then flees the house by Paperwing (a magically propelled plane-like structure.) While in the air, Sabriel and Mogget are attacked by the Dead, and Sabriel loosens Mogget's collar to avoid a fatal crash. They fall into a sinkhole, where Mogget, in his unbound form, attempts to murder Sabriel. However, she is able to bind him anew with a ring given to her for that purpose.

The next day, Sabriel and Mogget walk through a tunnel to another sinkhole, which Mogget determines to be Holehallow, the historical burial place of the royal family. Each king is buried in a boat. Sabriel discovers that the figurehead on one of the boats is not a wooden carving but an actual man, who has been imprisoned in that form for two hundred years. The man tells Sabriel that he was a Royal Guard before his imprisonment, and asks to be called Touchstone (a jester's name) for reasons that remain cryptic.

Sabriel, Touchstone, and Mogget continue their journey, stopping to help rid a seaside village of a Dead creature. They obtain a boat there and sail up the coast of the Old Kingdom until they reach Belisaere, the capital. They find the Abhorsen in an underground reservoir in Belisaere, trapped in Death. Since he has stayed too long in Death, he cannot return for long, but with what little time he has left, the Abhorsen tells Sabriel about the evil known as Kerrigor. Kerrigor has risen far from Death and intends to wreak havoc in the Old Kingdom and Ancelstierre. Sabriel releases her father from Death, and once they emerge from Death, father and daughter part for the last time — he, to ring the bell Astarael (the sound of which throws everyone who hears it far into the realm of Death) and delay Kerrigor's havoc; and she, to save Touchstone by bringing him (and herself) as far away from Astarael's music as possible. To prevent him from losing to Death, she kisses him roughly in order to keep him focused on Life. In the process of ringing Astarael, Sabriel's father releases Mogget.

They succeed, but as long as Kerrigor's body is intact, he will rise from Death again and again. Sabriel and Touchstone use another Paperwing to bring them as close to the Wall as possible, and cross over to Ancelstierre to find Kerrigor's body, following the clairvoyant guidance of the Clayr twins Sanar and Ryelle. They find the body, and Sabriel finally defeats Kerrigor by binding him with Ranna and Mogget's collar.

She dies but the previous Abhorsens prevent her from crossing into Final Death as she cannot die without someone else to take her place as Abhorsen. She wakes up with Touchstone before her, and both Mogget and Kerrigor asleep, bound by Ranna (the first of seven necromantic bells that instills sleep and quiescence in those who hear it).

Important characters and magical entities

The Bloodlines

Thousands of years ago, seven of the Nine Bright Shiners sacrificed their powers to create the Charter: a combination of powerful objects (the Great Stones and the Wall) and three magic blood lines, known as the Abhorsen, the Clayr and the Royal Family. Five of the Seven completely lost themselves (one in each object or blood line) while two remained somewhat independent. One invested his/her power in the Royal bloodline, one in the Abhorsen's and one in the Clayr's (which is why the Clayr greet Sabriel as "cousin"). The remaining two, known as the "Wallmakers" invested themselves in several objects of power, including the Stones and Wall, then disappeared. These artifacts, the Charter Stones, are sources of the web of Charter magic that maintains peace and order over the kingdom. The Bloodlines all have a higher concentration of strong Charter mages than the general populace.

The Abhorsens

One of the most respected figures in the Old Kingdom, the Abhorsen uses both the dangerous Free Magic-based powers of a necromancer and the benevolent magic of the Charter to keep the gates of Death against the return of Dead spirits back into Life.  Sabriel and her father are members of the Abhorsen family.  They use the bells, named after the seven bright shiners that established the old kingdom, in tandem with their natural affinity with Death, granted by their ancestor bright shiner, to amplify their powers.  The bells, smallest to largest, are Ranna, Mosrael, Kibeth, Dyrim, Belgaer, Saraneth, and Astarael.  Saraneth, the "binder", is thought to be the original Abhorsen, and the bright shiner who invested her powers in this bloodline.  Her gift is "binding", just as the Abhorsens job is to "bind" the dead to Death.  Ranna the "sleepbringer", causing listeners to fall asleep; she is the least tricksome.  Mosrael, "the waker", wakes the dead, bringing them into life as it throws the necromancer farther into death.  Kibeth, "walker", forces the dead to march back into death, or wherever the ringer desires, although if the ringer is not careful it may end up "walking" her.  Dyrim is the "speaker", granting the ability of speech to the dead, or taking it away.  Belgaer is the "thinker" and can restore independent thought to the dead and resurrect old memories, but can also erase them in a careless hand.  Astarael is the "Sorrowful".  Last and final of the bells, she sends all who hear her, including the ringer, deep into death.  It is nearly impossible to return after hearing Astarael. Like all three bloodlines, the Abhorsen bloodline not only defines their job (the Abhorsen may only be chosen from direct blood relatives) and grants them their powers, but also determines their appearance.  All members of the Abhorsen family have black hair and their skin is unnaturally pale.  Among the families guarding the Old Kingdom from disaster, and the only family guarding it from disasters from Death, Abhorsens are unique in their ability to sense Death.  They are able to identify undead creatures and differentiate them from the living, and cross over into Death to fight undead minions there and banish them to a final death.  They are also the only ones who have the proper authority to enter Death, and therefore the only Necromancers who retain uncorrupted charter marks and mage powers.  Their symbol is a silver key on a background of blue.

The Royal Family

For centuries, the royalty justly ruled the Old Kingdom from their palace at the capital Belisaere as powerful upholders of the peace, until their fall by the hands of Kerrigor, or Prince Rogirek nicknamed Rogir, a rogue member of the royal family who killed his sisters and mother to use their blood to break the Great Charter Stones. The Kingdom now suffers from their 200-year absence. Unlike the Abhorsens, the Royalty cannot cross into Death at will and do not usually use Free Magic. Their specialty lies in diplomacy and Charter magic. They are connected to the Clayr and Abhorsens in that they're a Great Charter. It is thought they are descended from Dyrim, the "speaker", because of their skill in diplomacy. Their symbol is a golden tower on a sea of red.

The Clayr

The largest family among the magical bloodlines, the Clayr are arbiters of justice and foresight who see all from their glacier in the northernmost parts of the Old Kingdom. The Clayr are a family of seers who may, when there is need, pool their powers together to see clear visions of the future, while individually they see only splinters. The Clayr also possess abilities in Charter Magic, but to a lesser extent than the Abhorsen or Royal family lines. They are descended from Mosrael, the "waker". The Clayr celebrate the young's "awakening" of their sight when they receive their first vision. Like the Abhorsen, the Clayr have a strong family resemblance. All daughters of the Clayr (they have few sons), excluding Remembrancers, have brown skin and blonde, almost white, hair. The Glacier of the Clayr is home to a great library, as well, which is a repository of magic and history, and is even used as "cold storage" for particularly dangerous, but immortal, creatures. Their symbol is a seven pointed star.

The Wallmakers

The Wallmakers were the builders of the Wall that divides the Old Kingdom from Ancelstriere and creators of the Charter Stones; A Charter Magic bloodline particularly skilled in the creation of magical objects. They created the weaponry of the Royal Family (such as the twin swords wielded by Touchstone), the ceramic, nearly impervious armor known as Gethre owned by the Abhorsens, the Abhorsen's sword, and other powerful Charter Magic objects and weapons possessed by the Clayr. It can be deduced that they were the last 2 bright shiners, Ranna and Belgaer. They invested all of their power in their creations, thus leaving no bloodline. Therefore, for the majority of the books, it is apparent that the Wallmakers are 'extinct' and no longer exist. By the end of Lirael and for the whole of Abhorsen, we find out that the Wallmaker bloodline has been reconstituted in Prince Sameth, explaining his uncanny ability to create magical "toys" and enchant weaponry, which otherwise would 'take months' to do. The line was probably brought back for the sole purpose of defeating Orannis. The symbol of the Wallmaker is a silver trowel or spade.

The Dead And Free Magic Creatures

The Greater Dead:
The souls of dead necromancers who have used their dark knowledge to rise from Death. These creatures are the strongest of the Dead and with their necromantic powers they can raise and command the lesser dead. The most powerful of the Greater Dead is Kerrigor, who is the only undead creature to retain his full potential for Free magic after death. Sabriel implies that the true home of the greater dead is beyond the Seventh Gate of Death.

The Lesser Dead: 
The collective name for all dead spirits which lack the knowledge and power it takes to become one of the greater dead. Most lesser dead are the souls after ordinary mortals who refused to accept death. They often died under unfortunate circumstances, like Thralk who died in a hunting accident. It is also implied that powerful undead can enslave unwilling souls and force them to become lesser dead. Sabriel fears this fate when she is running from the Mordicant.

Mordicant:
A powerful Lesser Dead Free Magic creature which can easily pass through the Gates of Death and into Life where it has a strong hold. It is created by a necromancer by molding bog-clay and human blood, infusing it with Free Magic, and placing a Dead spirit inside. It is described as man-like, with eyes like fire, and grey-green flesh that drips with flames and smoke.
Sabriel defeated a weak Mordicant when she was fourteen years old. However, a very strong one stalked Sabriel on her journey from Ancelstierre to the Abhorsen's House. As Sabriel drew closer to the Door in the Long Cliffs leading to the Abhorsen's House, it gave chase, but Sabriel made it to the door and through a passageway due to its Charter Magic Guard which momentarily held off the Mordicant. The Abhorsen's bridge leading to the house stopped the Mordicant as the undead cannot cross fast and deep running water. The Mordicant then led a siege using Shadow hands and living human slaves who worked non-stop for days to fill the river with earth to allow him to cross. To end the siege, Sabriel called on the Clayr's gift of water bringing forth a massive wave to wipe the Mordicant and his slaves away.

Thralk:
A dead spirit that slipped out of Death after the commotion Kerrigor caused in breaking through all the gates single-handedly. It stayed in Life for decades, feeding off humans. It found Sabriel in Life on Cloven Crest while she was in Death, though surrounded by a diamond of protection. Sabriel sensed when the creature broke through her protection, and banished it to death with the Abhorsen's sword and the bell Kibeth. Thralk died 300 years before when a hunting spear rebounded off a rock and cut his throat.

Shadow Hands:
Dead creatures controlled and created by a necromancer. Usually a skilled necromancer uses the heads of dead humans to bring back only their spirits, forming an incorporeal, and dark shadow that only has a pair of hands and does the bidding of the necromancer. Shadow Hands are difficult to destroy by mere force, but can be easily put to rest by the bells of the Abhorsen.
Sabriel suspected a necromancer of having formed Shadow Hands from the soldiers close to Cloven Crest. They attacked Wyverly College after the Dead Hands made it past the soldiers and while Sabriel was attempting to destroy Rogirrek (Rogir)/Kerrigor's body.

Mordaut:
One of the weaker Dead creatures; a parasite. It cohabits a human body, controlling and hiding in it, and slowly saps the life from it in order to avoid Death. Once it has nearly consumed the soul of the host, it comes out at night and takes the life of any other human around it. It has no definite form and moves like a pool of darkness from host to host. 
Sabriel encountered a Mordaut on the tiny rocky islet of Nestowe, inhabiting the body of a fisherman named Patar. Once she had sensed it and was putting it to sleep with Ranna, the Mordaut killed Patar by sucking all the life out of him instantly. Sabriel stabbed it with her sword and sent it deep into Death using the bells Saraneth (the Binder), Ranna (the Sleepbringer), and Kibeth (the Walker).

Gore Crows:
Ordinary crows trapped, killed with a ritual, and infused with a single human spirit by a necromancer. They disintegrate in the sun, are torn apart by wind, and decay over time, but they can fly over running water. They are strongest when freshly killed, infused with a strong spirit, and are great in numbers. They seemingly fly without the use of wings or plumage as they are suspended by the Free Magic which was used to create them. 
A flock of gore crows attacks Sabriel when she is flying in the Paperwing after escaping from Abhorsen's house.

Characters in Sabriel
 Sabriel — Title character.  53rd Abhorsen. She is 18 and finishing her last year at Wyverly College at the start of the novel.
 Mogget — An ancient Free Magic construct of unknown origin; appears in the form of a white cat and is bound by a red Charter magic collar to serve the Abhorsen.
 Touchstone — A bastard prince, son of a former Queen and a nobleman, and is the only remaining heir of the Royal Blood.  He was trapped as the wooden figurehead of a ceremonial boat for two hundred years by the Abhorsen of that time in order to save him (and his Blood) from death.  He is also Sabriel's growing love interest as the story progresses.
 Kerrigor — Formerly known as Rogir, or Rogirrek.  A Greater Dead adept in Free Magic necromancy, former member of the Royal Family, and who is at odds with the Charter. Powerful Spells of past Abhorsens bound him to Death and his body was buried in Ancelstierre beyond the Wall where magic was not present; but during Sabriel's father's time, he has awoken and once again trying to destroy the Charter which binds Free Magic. The name Kerrigor, as is revealed by Touchstone, was a childhood nickname, made up by the royal prince himself.  It is derived from his full ceremonial name, Rogirek.
 Terciel (known as "Abhorsen") — Sabriel's father, Abhorsen before Sabriel. Revived his daughter after she died at birth. He was unable to save his wife, who died during child birth. Although he rarely visited her physically while she was at school, he would often visit her through sendings of himself in the fireplace at the dark of the moon each month.

Major themes

This book deals with the loss of family (Sabriel's and Touchstone's) and coming to terms with oneself and one's responsibilities. Abhorsen's final words to Sabriel, "Everyone and everything has a time to die," refer to the idea of sacrifice.
Another theme is that of destiny. Both the Book of the Dead and Sabriel's almanac contain the lines:

Does the Walker choose the Path, or the Path the Walker?

Death is not considered a bad thing as such, and loss is shown to be something that builds character.

Awards
Sabriel won the Aurealis Award for best young-adult novel and best fantasy novel in 1995. It is also an ALA Notable Book and was a short-list nominee for the 1996 Ditmar Award for best long fiction.

Film
According to Publishing News, Garth Nix was preparing to pitch a Sabriel film to studios in mid-2008 via Steve Fisher at APA. Nix co-wrote the screenplay with Dan Futterman, actor and Oscar-nominated screenwriter of Capote (2005), and Dede Gardner and Jeremy Kleiner at Plan B Entertainment were to produce. The director would be Anand Tucker. Planning for the pitch was delayed by the writer's strike, and resumed in February. While the current status of any film is unknown, Nix is now represented by Matthew Snyder at CAA.

References

External links

1995 Australian novels
Old Kingdom series books
Aurealis Award-winning works
Australian fantasy novels
Australian young adult novels
Novels by Garth Nix
Fictional undead
1995 fantasy novels
Books with cover art by Leo and Diane Dillon
HarperCollins books